Fort Kent may refer to:

Fort Kent, Alberta, Canada, a hamlet
Fort Kent, Maine, US, a town
Fort Kent (CDP), Maine, the main village in the town
Fort Kent (fort), a historic site in the town